Portrait of Young Woman with Unicorn is a painting by Raphael, which art historians date c. 1505-1506. It is in the Galleria Borghese in Rome. The painting was originally oil on panel, and was transferred to canvas during conservation work in 1934. It was in the course of this work that overpainting was removed, revealing the unicorn, and removing the wheel, cloak, and palm frond that had been added by an unknown painter during the mid-17th century.

The composition of the picture—placing the figure in a loggia opening out onto a landscape, the three-quarter length format—was apparently inspired by the Mona Lisa, painted by Leonardo between 1503 and 1506. Christof Thoenes observes: "However unabashedly Raphael adopts the pose, compositional framework and spatial organization of the Leonardo portrait...the cool watchfulness in the young woman's gaze is very different" from the "enigmatic ambiguity" of Mona Lisa.

The work was of uncertain attribution until recent times. In the 1760 inventory of the Gallery, the subject of the painting was identified as Saint Catherine of Alexandria and attributed to Perugino. A restoration of the painting in 1934–36 confirmed art historian Roberto Longhi's attribution of the work to Raphael, and the removal of heavy repainting revealed the unicorn, traditionally a symbol of chastity in medieval romance, in place of a Saint Catherine wheel. Restoration work on the painting in 1959 revealed through radiography the image of a small dog, a symbol of conjugal fidelity, under the unicorn. It served as a sketch for the final appearance of the unicorn.

See also
List of paintings by Raphael
 Giulia Farnese

Notes

References

External links

1506 paintings
Paintings in the Borghese Collection
Portraits by Raphael
Works about unicorns